Basarab or Bassarab can refer to:

The House of Basarab
Basarab railway station, in Bucharest, Romania
Basarab metro station, in Bucharest, Romania
Basarab Nicolescu
Basarab Panduru
Alexandru Bassarab
Maria Basarab
Olha Basarab
Basarab I of Wallachia

 See also
Bessarabia